Pomoriany Castle is a ruined castle in the urban-type settlement of Pomoriany, Zolochiv Raion, Lviv Oblast, Ukraine. It originated in the 16th century as a well-fortified noble residence on the bank of the Zolota Lypa River. The castle's early owners included Mikolaj Świnka and Jan Sienieński.

The estate suffered badly at the hands of the Cossacks and Turks (1675, 1684) but Jan III Sobieski invested in the restoration in order to make Pomorzany one of his country residences. Sobieski's death in 1696 was followed by another long period of decline.

A real change came about in the castle's fortunes when, in 1789, Erasm Pruszyński started transforming the dilapidated building into a modern residence. He had the barbican gate, three towers and several wings of the old structure torn down, however.

As recently as 1939, Pomorzany was owned by the famous Potocki family. Following the September Campaign, the building was adapted for use as a school, but it was finally abandoned to rot in the late 1970s.

References
 Памятники градостроительства и архитектуры Украинской ССР. Киев: Будивельник, 1983–1986. Том 3, с. 139.

Castles in Ukraine
Ruined castles in Ukraine
Buildings and structures in Lviv Oblast

pl:Pomorzany (Ukraina)